Kicking Horse Pass (el. ) is a high mountain pass across the Continental Divide of the Americas of the Canadian Rockies on the Alberta–British Columbia border, and lying within Yoho and Banff national parks. Divide Creek forks onto both sides of the Continental Divide.

Explorers
First Nations had known and used the pass, but it was first explored by Europeans in 1858 by the Palliser Expedition led by Captain John Palliser.  It and the adjacent Kicking Horse River were named after James Hector (Hector's Branch Expeditions, 3 August 1858 – 26 May 1859), was kicked by his horse while attempting rescue of another horse that had gone into the river.

From Hector's summary, which appears on pages 105–106 of Palliser's diary,

Railway
A National Historic Site of Canada, the main line of the Canadian Pacific Railway (CPR) was constructed between Lake Louise, Alberta and Field, British Columbia using this route in 1884, in preference to the original survey through the more northerly Yellowhead Pass.

The original section of the CPR between the summit of the pass near Wapta Lake and Field was known as "The Big Hill". With a ruling gradient of 4.5% (1 in 23), it was the steepest stretch of main-line railroad in North America.

Owing to frequent accidents and expensive helper engines associated with railroading in the pass, the CPR built the two Spiral Tunnels that opened in 1909, replacing the direct route. Although they add several kilometres, they reduce the ruling grade to a more manageable 2.2% (1 in 46). Accidents still occur, including a major derailment in 2019 that killed three CPR employees.

Road
The pack train trail over the pass, established at the time of the railway, gradually became a wagon road. In 1928, the Golden–Lake Louise highway, which essentially followed the CPR route, was completed.

This section of the Trans-Canada Highway, built in 1962, follows a more northerly placement along the eastern approach.

The Golden Triangle cycling route includes the pass.

Television
Dave Broadfoot played The Honourable Member for Kicking Horse Pass in the CBC Television satirical series Royal Canadian Air Farce and in his personal standup routines.

Images

See also
 List of Rocky Mountain passes on the continental divide

References

External links 

Zoomable map of Kicking Horse Pass showing railway 
Ten Mile Hill Project HD Video
LibriVox Audiobook Recordings

Canadian Rockies
Mountain passes of Alberta
Mountain passes of British Columbia
Great Divide of North America
Rail mountain passes of Alberta
Rail mountain passes of British Columbia
Heritage sites in British Columbia
Canadian Pacific Railway
National Historic Sites in Alberta
National Historic Sites in British Columbia
Borders of British Columbia
Borders of Alberta
Mountains of Banff National Park
Mountains of Yoho National Park